Google Play Services is a proprietary software package produced by Google for installation on Android devices. It consists of background services and libraries for use by mobile apps running on the device  When it was introduced in 2012, it provided access to the Google+ APIs and OAuth 2.0. It expanded to cover a variety of Google services, allowing applications to communicate with the services through common means.

The packages' services include location tracking and geofencing, single sign-on account services, user health and fitness tracking, payment processing, integrated advertising, and security scanning. Many apps on Android devices depend on the use of Google Play Services, and the package requires the user to use a Google Account and agree to Google's terms of service. Distributing Google Play Services on an Android device requires a license from Google, which contractually prohibits device producers from producing Android devices that are incompatible with Google's Android specifications.

Services 

Google Play Game Services can be used by application developers to allow a competitive and social experience through the use of leaderboards, achievements, and multiplayer sessions. Saved Games API is available to sync game saves on Google's cloud infrastructure. Location APIs provide specifications about the location technologies, providing geofencing APIs for scheduling specific actions when the user enters or leaves specific geographic boundaries, Fused Location Provider acquires location information such as reduced power usage and activity recognition for allowing applications to adapt to the current action of the user (e.g. cycling, walking, etc.).

The Google Sign-in Android API provides single sign-on, authenticating the user inside applications using Google Account credentials. The Google Maps Android API allows applications to include Google Maps or Street View without the need to open a separate application, allowing full control over the camera and providing a means of adding custom markers and map overlays. The Google Drive Android API allows Google Drive to be used as a storage structure, providing lookup and syncing of documents along with other file manipulation tools. The Google Cast Android API adds casting functionality to allow Android applications to display content on TVs using Google Cast, additionally providing various helpers for common audio, video, and image types.

Google Mobile Ads integrates advertisements into applications, allowing monetization by targeting ads based on factors such as user location. The Google Pay API allows purchases of services and goods via Google Pay. Other APIs include the Google Fit API, account authentication methods, and Google Analytics.

Google Play Services is used by almost all Google apps that have system-level powers. All major Android services are controlled by Google Play Services, and many third-party apps also depend on it. Without this and its requirement to log in with a Google Account, apps may not work properly.

Google Play Protect is a unification of Android security systems. In 2019, the company announced that the software was scanning 50 million apps per day. On November 6, 2019, Google announced the App Defense Alliance. Partners can request Google Play Protect to analyze an app. Results are sent to the partner and Google Play Protect receives results from partners. As of November, 2019, partners of the App Defense Alliance include: ESET, Lookout and Zimperium.

Adoption 

Google Play Services is automatically updated through Google Play on devices with Android 4.4 or newer. This means Google can deliver updates without manufacturers having to update the Android firmware, working around the fragmentation of the platform that has become infamous for Android products.

Concerns 
The Android Open Source Project (AOSP) was announced in 2007, and functioned as the baseline system for all OEMs and firmware modifications such as CyanogenMod and LineageOS. Various AOSP apps were transferred to Google Play with a closed-source model. Many apps (such as Lyft, Uber, and many of the Google apps like Gmail and YouTube) function only when the Google Play Services package is available and enabled.

Distributing Google Play Services as a part of the Google apps package requires a license from Google, which contractually prohibits device producers from producing Android devices that are incompatible with Google's Android specifications. Others who are interested in modifying the Android system are required to either opt-out of Google Play Services or to obtain the Google apps package from either a device that has them pre-installed or an unofficial source.

See also 
 MicroG – open source implementation

References

External links 
 
Overview of Google Play Services on Google Developers

Android (operating system)
Android (operating system) software
Play Services